Prior to the French Revolution, Strasbourg was led by an Ammestre.

List of Mayors of Strasbourg since the French Revolution

References 

 
Strasbourg
History of Strasbourg